Minnesota State Highway 102 (MN 102) is a  highway in northwest Minnesota, which runs from its intersection with State Highway 32 outside Fertile and continues northwest to its northern terminus at its intersection with State Highway 9 (one mile south of U.S. Highway 2) near the city of Crookston.

Highway 102 passes through the communities of Garfield Township, Onstad Township, Kertsonville Township, and Fairfax Township.

Route description
State Highway 102 serves as a northwest–southeast route in northwest Minnesota between the cities of Fertile and Crookston.

Highway 102 is located in the Red River Valley region of Minnesota.

The route is legally defined as Route 178 in the Minnesota Statutes. It is not marked with this number.

History
State Highway 102 was authorized on April 22, 1933.

The route was paved in 1949.

Major intersections

References

External links

Highway 102 at the Unofficial Minnesota Highways Page

102
Transportation in Polk County, Minnesota